The United States House Financial Services Subcommittee on Financial Institutions and Monetary Policy is a subcommittee of the House Committee on Financial Services. Jurisdiction over domestic monetary policy was transferred to it at the start of the 118th Congress, before which the subcommittee was known as the Subcommittee on Consumer Protection and Financial Institutions.

Jurisdiction
The subcommittee oversees all financial regulators, such as the Federal Deposit Insurance Corporation and the Federal Reserve, all matters pertaining to consumer credit including the Consumer Credit Protection Act and access to financial services, as well as the safety and soundness of the banking system.

Members, 117th Congress

Historical membership rosters

115th Congress

116th Congress

External links
Official page

FinServ Consumer Protection